Joseph Mantle (9 May 1908 – 1977) was an English professional footballer who played as a centre forward. He was a prolific goalscorer for a number of clubs in the Football League, and also had a short spell in the Scottish Football League with Hearts.

References

1908 births
1977 deaths
People from Hetton-le-Hole
Footballers from Tyne and Wear
English footballers
Association football forwards
Burnley F.C. players
Plymouth Argyle F.C. players
Chester City F.C. players
Carlisle United F.C. players
Stockport County F.C. players
Heart of Midlothian F.C. players
Hartlepool United F.C. players
English Football League players
Scottish Football League players